The U.S. Post Office in Santa Barbara, California is a combined post office-federal office building in Santa Barbara, California. The post office is a prominent example of Mission Revival-influenced Art Deco design and is a significant building in the historic core of Santa Barbara. It was designed by Pasadena architect Reginald Davis Johnson in the mid-1930s, and was completed in 1937. The building retains a high degree of architectural integrity, with minimal changes to the interior and no changes to the exterior, which retains its original landscaping.

Description
The Santa Barbara Post Office has a generally Spanish Colonial character that harmonizes with traditional local architecture, using a terra cotta roof and white stuccoed walls. The building was constructed in reinforced concrete.  Although the building is composed with Mission Revival elements and massing, the details are Art Deco, with chevron details typically used by Johnson and complementary sculpture.  The bronze doors and building hardware are more characteristic of Art Deco than of Mission. Streamline Moderne interior reliefs are by William Atkinson, using motifs typical of the 1930s.

The Santa Barbara Post Office was placed on the National Register of Historic Places on January 11, 1985.

See also 
List of United States post offices

References 

Buildings and structures in Santa Barbara, California
Government buildings completed in 1937
National Register of Historic Places in Santa Barbara County, California
Santa Barbara
Art Deco architecture in California
Mission Revival architecture in California